Alexander White (1738October 9, 1804) was a distinguished early American lawyer and politician in the present-day U.S. states of Virginia and West Virginia. He served in the House of Burgesses (representing Hampshire County), the Virginia House of Delegates (representing Frederick County and later Berkeley County. During the American Revolutionary War, White facilitated the release of Quaker and Hessian civilian prisoners held by patriots. White also participated in the Virginia Ratifying Convention (in which Virginia ratified the United States Constitution in 1788) and became the northwestern Virginia district's inaugural member in the United States House of Representatives (1789 to 1793). United States President George Washington appointed White one of the commissioners responsible for the planning and construction of Washington, D.C. (1795 to 1802).

The son of Virginia pioneer settler and physician Dr. Robert White (1688–1752); White was a member of the prominent White political family of Virginia and West Virginia. His nephew became Virginia judge Robert White (1759–1831), another nephew became United States Congressman Francis White (1761–1826), and his brother-in-law was Virginia Governor James Wood (1741–1813).

Early life and education
Alexander White was born in 1738 to Dr. Robert White (1688–1752) and his wife, Margaret Hoge, at "White Hall" in the Colony of Virginia, near present-day Hayfield then in vast Orange County (later part of Frederick County, which was created later that year). White's father, Dr. Robert White, had served as a surgeon in the Royal Navy of the Kingdom of Great Britain. Between 1732 and 1735, Dr. White became a "pioneer settler" and one of two practicing physicians in what became Frederick County. Through his father, White was of Scottish descent and raised in the Presbyterian faith.

Dr. White sent his son to Scotland, where he studied jurisprudence at the University of Edinburgh. White continued his law studies in London, England, where he was admitted to the Inner Temple on January 15, 1762, and matriculated at Gray's Inn on January 22, 1763. White remained in Britain and completed his law studies during what Virginians called the French and Indian War.

Lawyer and politician 
White returned to Virginia in 1765, where he was admitted to the bar, began practicing law and became a prominent lawyer in the Shenandoah Valley region with a "national reputation". White became deputy King's attorney for Frederick County in 1772.

House of Burgesses
Hampshire County voters elected as one of their two (part-time) representatives to the House of Burgesses in Williamsburg in 1772, but he only served a year of what became a two-year term, resigning in 1773 in order to accept a position as deputy king's attorney, and replaced by Joseph Neville. James Mercer was Hampshire County's other representative; although he lived near Fredericksburg, his family owned land in Hampshire County. White also served with Patrick Henry; Henry reportedly never cast his vote without first consulting with White. White was an eloquent public speaker, and due to his Scottish Presbyterian background, he strongly opposed the colonial government's support for the Church of England in Virginia. Therefore, White presented a resolution before the House of Burgesses regarding the separation of church and state. According to historians Hu Maxwell and Howard Llewellyn Swisher, White is the first man in what is now the United States to present a resolution to a legislature regarding the freedom of religion.

When the first court of Berkeley County convened on May 19, 1772, the judges appointed White as the King's attorney for the county. White resigned from the House of Burgesses upon being appointed the deputy King's attorney for the Colony of Virginia in 1773.

American Revolutionary War
While White did not engage in military service during the American Revolutionary War, he remained active in the practice of law in Winchester throughout the war's duration. According to tradition, White facilitated the release of Quaker and Hessian civilian prisoners held by American Revolutionary patriots in a building in the southern part of Winchester. The Quakers and Hessians were imprisoned under the suspicion of their perceived support of British forces. The prisoners asked White to assist them with their release, and paid him 100 Virginia pounds. Following the British retreat from the Philadelphia campaign, White traveled to Philadelphia to negotiate with the "executive authority" concerning the prisoners' release to Pennsylvania, where public sentiment demanded their return. White successfully secured their release upon the condition that they affirm that "they would henceforth live by their creed and be at peace with all men."

Virginia House of Delegates
From 1782 to 1786, White was elected annually and served in the Virginia House of Delegates, representing Frederick County (Winchester being the county seat) alongside Charles Mynn Thruston (three times, although White only arrived a month after the Virginia General Assembly began its first legislative session), and alongside James Wood in the 1784–1785 term. White served another term in the Virginia House of Delegates in 1788 alongside John Shearman Woodcock.

In 1788, White and Woodcock also participated in the Virginia Ratifying Convention, in which Virginia ratified the United States Constitution. White is believed to have used the pseudonym "An Independent Freeholder" to author a series of essays written in support of the Constitution's ratification. The essays were published in the January 18 and 25, 1788, issues of the Winchester Virginia Gazette newspaper. After his congressional service, White served two additional terms in the Virginia House of Delegates from 1799 to 1801, again representing Berkeley County, where he owned a significant amount of land.

United States House of Representatives
White served two terms as the inaugural member to represent Virginia's 1st congressional district in the United States House of Representatives during the 1st United States Congress and the 2nd United States Congress (March 4, 1789 – March 3, 1793). White was the first person residing in what later became West Virginia to occupy a seat in the United States Congress. During his tenure, White's congressional district spanned from Harpers Ferry to the Ohio River. As he was previously known in the House of Burgesses, White was reportedly one of the more eloquently spoken members in the first Congress and also known for his "remarkable punctuality".

White voted in favor of the Residence Act, the United States federal law that settled the question of locating the capital of the United States along the Potomac River in Maryland and Virginia. Three days after the Residence Act became law, the United States House of Representatives agreed upon the Funding Act as part of the Compromise of 1790, to address the issue of funding domestic debt. On August 9, 1790, the Funding Act became law. White voted in support of the Funding Act; however, according to Thomas Jefferson, White's vote was the result of an argument that occurred at a dinner hosted by Jefferson, after which White and Richard Bland Lee changed their votes in favor of the Funding Act. Jefferson stated that White reluctantly supported the bill "with a revulsion of stomach almost convulsive". The votes of both White and Lee carried the Funding Act measure, making the enactment of the Residence Act possible.

White was re-elected to his seat in 1791 after defeating his opponents, William Darke and General James Wood. According to GovTrack, from May 1789 to March 1793, White missed 26 of 211 recorded votes (or 12.3%). White's voting participation was higher than the median of 14.6% among the lifetime records of representatives serving in March 1793. Following the adjournment of the 2nd United States Congress, and the completion of his term in 1793, White retired from public life and went to his estate, "Woodville", in Frederick County near Winchester.

City of Washington Board of Commissioners 
On May 18, 1795, White was appointed by United States President George Washington to serve as one of the three commissioners responsible for supervising the raising of funds, planning, design, and acquisition of property and the erection of public buildings in the city of Washington and the federal district. White had been selected to replace Daniel Carroll on the board following Carroll's resignation. While on the board, White was paid a salary of $1,600 per year for his services; White continued to serve on the board until May 1, 1802, when it was abolished. He concurrently served as one of the directors of the Potomac Company, which made improvements to the Potomac River and improved its navigability for commerce.

Personal life and family
In 1796, White married Elizabeth Wood (September 20, 1739 – October 24, 1782), the daughter of Colonel James Wood, founder of Winchester, Virginia, and his wife, Mary Rutherford Wood. Colonel Wood was also the father of James Wood, an officer in the Continental Army during the American Revolutionary War and the 11th Governor of Virginia. Following the death of his wife, Elizabeth, White remarried on June 10, 1784, in present-day Berkeley County, to Sarah Cotter Hite, the widow of John Hite.

Land ownership
On either June 2 or November 5, 1773, White purchased the  estate of Henry Heth, who had foreclosed on his mortgage agreement with William McMachen. McMachen sold the property to White for 500 pounds following his relocation to Hampshire County. White renamed the property "Woodville", presumably after his wife Elizabeth's family, and it remained his primary residence until his death in 1804.

White owned "valuable lands" in Hampshire County, which enabled him to represent that county while serving as a member of the House of Burgesses. On June 12, 1769, White and Angus McDonald purchased  on the Little Cacapon and North rivers, and another  on the Little Cacapon River in Hampshire County. White also owned a significant amount of land in Berkeley County, which he represented in the Virginia House of Delegates.

Later life
White continued to practice law throughout his political career. In October 1776, White was named a trustee for the town of Bath, after its conveyance from Thomas Fairfax, 6th Lord Fairfax of Cameron. In October 1786, White was also appointed a trustee for Charles Town.

Death and legacy 
White died on October 9, 1804, at his "Woodville" estate in Frederick County, Virginia. He died without children, thus leaving no descendants. White was interred at the Wood family's "Glen Burnie" estate in Winchester, Virginia.

His will was drafted on May 26, 1804, and proved on December 3, 1804, following his death. In his will, White left the bulk of his property and assets to his nephews and nieces. Although in his lifetime, White had opposed the "Quaker memorial relating to slavery", and owned six enslaved adults and 7 enslaved children in 1787, the will also manumitted his slaves. White left his "Woodville" estate to his nephew, Judge Robert White.

In his book, The History of the Virginia Federal Convention of 1788 (1891), Virginia historian Hugh Blair Grigsby remarked of White, "Perhaps no member of the able and patriotic delegation which the West contributed to our early councils exerted a greater influence in moulding public opinion, especially during the period embraced by the treaty of peace with Great Britain and by the adoption of the Federal Constitution, than Alexander White, of Frederick."

White had a Liberty ship named for him in 1942 during World War II. The SS Alexander White, MC hull 139, was laid down on October 11, 1942, and launched on December 7, 1942. It was scrapped in 1964.

References

Bibliography

External links
 

1738 births
1804 deaths
18th-century American landowners
18th-century American lawyers
18th-century American politicians
18th-century Presbyterians
19th-century American landowners
19th-century American lawyers
19th-century Presbyterians
Alumni of the University of Edinburgh
American landowners
American people of English descent
American people of Scottish descent
American planters
American slave owners
County King's attorneys in Virginia
Delegates to the Virginia Ratifying Convention
English lawyers
House of Burgesses members
Members of Gray's Inn
Members of the Inner Temple
Members of the United States House of Representatives from Virginia
Members of the Virginia House of Delegates
People from Berkeley County, West Virginia
People from Frederick County, Virginia
People from Hampshire County, West Virginia
Presbyterians from Virginia
Robert White family of Virginia and West Virginia
Trustees of populated places in Virginia
Virginia colonial people
Virginia lawyers
West Virginia colonial people